Grove is a tiny village in the parish of Slapton, Buckinghamshire, England.  It is on the border with Bedfordshire, just to the north of Mentmore.  It is the size of some hamlets, but it is distinct as a village because it had its own parish church.  The place name is fairly self-explanatory, as it means 'grove', or a copse of trees.  It was recorded in the Domesday Book of 1086 as Grova, and was considered a separate village even then.

In medieval times there was an abbey or priory of nuns in the parish, founded in 1169 by Henry II and attached to Fontevrault Abbey in France.  Following the wars with France it was given to the dean and Canons of Windsor.  The remains of this abbey were fully excavated in the late 1960s just before they were lost forever in connection with the sand-quarrying industry of Leighton Buzzard.  It has been suggested that before this Grove may once have been an important place of worship in even more ancient times, thus leading to its establishment as a separate parish.  The parish church was dedicated to St. Michael, the dragon slayer.

There was also in addition to the priory, a house of Cistercian monks, subordinate to Woburn Abbey.

Immediately adjoining Grove was the lost hamlet known as South Waddon, today this remains only as the name of a nearby farm; however earth workings in the area suggest a substantial settlement if not fortifications.

Grove Church was converted into a small private house in the late 1970s.  The area that has become the sitting room of the house has the macabre feature of a Medieval human skeleton buried under a glass panel.  The skull is surrounded in turn by the skeletons of small birds, thought to have been put there to ward off evil spirits.  Part of the churchyard containing the newest graves was retained by the church authorities, following their controversial decision to sell the church.  It remains today but is closed for further burials.

A large farmhouse dominating the village, was during the early 1960s turned into a Victorian gothic mansion complete with clock tower when it was the property of the Shand-Kydd family.  The house overlooks and indeed is a landmark for the boats on The Grand Union Canal which actually flows through the centre of the village.  A former lock-keeper's cottage at nearby Grove Lock was in 2001 converted into a public house and restaurant.

External links

Villages in Buckinghamshire